TISS or Tiss may refer to:

 Tanzania Intelligence and Security Service
 Tata Institute of Social Sciences
TISS Mumbai
Tata Institute of Social Sciences, Hyderabad
 OTs-12 Tiss, a Russian assault rifle
 Jawhara Tiss (born 1985), a Tunisian politician

See also